CIBQ-FM (105.7 MHz, Real Country 105.7) is a radio station in Brooks, Alberta. Owned by Stingray Group, it broadcasts a country format.

History 
The station began broadcasting on April 15, 1973 as CKBR, until it changed to its current callsign in 1981. In 1985, CIBQ received approval to change frequencies from 1340 AM to 770 AM but was never implemented. CIBQ lost out to Calgary's CHQR for a move to 770 kHz.

On April 23, 2010, CIBQ received CRTC approval to move to FM on the frequency 105.7 MHz.

In February 2011, CIBQ officially moved to its new frequency, and rebranded from Q13 to Q105.7.

On November 7, 2016, CIBQ rebranded as Real Country 105.7 as part of the province-wide rebrand of all Newcap country radio stations on FM in Alberta under the "Real Country" network branding.

References

External links

CIBQ History - Canadian Communications Foundation

Brooks, Alberta
Ibq
Ibq
Ibq
Radio stations established in 1973
1973 establishments in Alberta